Jim Boyer may refer to:
 Jim Boyer (umpire) (1909–1959), American baseball umpire 
 Jim Boyer (audio engineer) (born 1951), American audio engineer